Caroline Myrtle Willemijn Hes (born 11 November 1982) is a Dutch woman cricketer. She made her international debut at the 2001 Women's European Cricket Championship. Caroline has played in 2 Women's ODIs.

References

External links 
 

1982 births
Living people
Dutch women cricketers
Netherlands women One Day International cricketers
Sportspeople from The Hague